The 1994 Australian Super Production Car Series was an Australian motor racing competition for production cars. It was the first and only series to be contested under the Australian Super Production Car Series name prior to the adoption of "Australian GT Production Car Series" for 1995 and subsequently "Australian GT Production Car Championship" for 1996.

The 1994 series differed from the 1994 Australian Production Car Championship in that it was open to cars more closely aligned with the James Hardie 12 Hour rather than restricted to the under 2.5 litre front wheel drive cars which were eligible for the Production Car Championship. It was won by Brad Jones driving a Lotus Esprit.

Schedule
The series was contested over six rounds with one race per round. Each round was a support race to a round of the 1994 Australian Manufacturers' Championship.

Results

Notes & references

External links
 Image of the Lotus Esprit of Brad Jones at the opening round of the series at Eastern Creek, www.sydneymotorsportpark.com.au, via web.archive.org

Australian GT Production Car Championship
Super Production Car Series